Maurade Glennon (born January 5, 1926), is an Irish writer and teacher who lives in Texas.

Glennon was born in Birr, Ireland, and received her early schooling at the Convent of Mercy in her hometown. She attended the Dominican College in Dublin from 1941 to 1943, St. Edward's University in Austin, Texas from 1959 to 1960, and University of Texas from 1961 to 1964. She has worked as a teacher and served on the board of directors of Austin Community Nursery Schools from 1963 to 1969.

Glennon began her writing career with short stories. Her debut work, "From Dublin's Fair City", won first prize in Mademoiselle's short story contest in 1964. Her works have appeared in several anthologies. She has published two novels, No More Septembers (1968) and The Waiting Time (1971).

Her papers are held at the Howard Gotlieb Archival Research Center at Boston University.

References

Sources 
 "Maurade Glennon." Contemporary Authors Online, Gale, 2001. Literature Resource Center.

1926 births
Possibly living people
Irish women novelists
People from Birr, County Offaly
Irish women short story writers
20th-century Irish short story writers
20th-century Irish novelists
20th-century Irish women writers